CJHQ-FM is a community radio station in Nakusp, British Columbia, broadcasting on 107.1 FM.

Owned by the Columbia Basin Alliance for Literacy, the station was licensed on April 15, 2005 and began broadcasting on September 5 of that year.

The station is one of several new community radio stations launched in the Kootenay region in the 2000s. Others include CJLY-FM in Nelson, CHLI-FM in Rossland, CFAD-FM in Salmo and CIDO-FM in Creston.

References

External links
CJHQ-FM|NCRA
CJHQ-FM history - Canadian Communication Foundation
Columbia Basin Alliance for Literacy

Jhq
Jhq
Radio stations established in 2005
2005 establishments in British Columbia